NGC 938 is an elliptical galaxy located in the constellation Aries, approximately 184 million light years from the Milky Way. It was discovered by the Prussian astronomer Heinrich d'Arrest in 1863.

SN 2015ab, a type Ia supernova, occurred within NGC 938.

See also 
 List of NGC objects (1–1000)

References

External links
 

Elliptical galaxies
Aries (constellation)
0938
009423